Huntington is an island-platformed Washington Metro station in the Huntington area of Fairfax County, Virginia, United States (though its mailing address says Alexandria). The station was opened on December 17, 1983, and is operated by the Washington Metropolitan Area Transit Authority (WMATA). Serving as the southern terminus for the Yellow Line, the station is built into a hillside; the south mezzanine, along with escalator access, is accessible via an incline elevator.

The station serves the suburban area of Fairfax County and is a popular commuter station with over 3,000 parking spaces. It is located between North Kings Highway (State Route 241) and Huntington Avenue, with parking facilities and station entrances available off of both roads. Service began on December 17, 1983, making it the first station to open in Fairfax County, and the first to extend the system beyond the Capital Beltway. The station is located on the ruins of Fort Lyon, a Civil War-era fort.

History
Originally scheduled to open in summer 1982, its opening was delayed due to both unavailability of new subway cars and the lack of a test track. Construction of the station was complete by summer 1982, and in September 1983 Metro announced the station would open that December as the new cars would be ready for service. The station opened on December 17, 1983.

In May 2018, Metro announced an extensive renovation of platforms at twenty stations across the system. The Blue and Yellow Lines south of Ronald Reagan Washington National Airport station, including the Huntington station, would be closed from May to September 2019. This will allow for the eventual demolition of an abandoned parking structure at Huntington, as well as the rehabilitation of a track crossover. The platform at the Huntington station itself will be rebuilt from January to May 2020.

Between September 10, 2022 and November 5, 2022, Huntington was closed due to the Potomac Yard station tie-in, closing all stations south of Ronald Reagan Washington National Airport station. Shuttle buses were provided throughout the shutdown. Additionally, beginning on November 6, 2022, Blue Line trains began serving Huntington due to the suspension of the Yellow Line from the 14th Street Bridge project. Trains will operate between Huntington and  stations until May 2023.

Station layout

Architecturally, Huntington station is different from the rest of the Metro network. It is partially elevated and built into the surrounding hillside. Riders enter the station from the north on a viaduct carrying the tracks from downtown Washington, D.C., but the south end of the island platform is below grade. The tracks continue into short tunnels in the hill, allowing for a future extension. The canopy is supported by buttresses that bridge the tracks into the sloped walls of the depression in which the station is built. This type of station makes it similar to the Dyckman Street station on the New York City Subway's IRT Broadway–Seventh Avenue Line. As a result of the unusual topography, there is an incline elevator at this station, the only one installed anywhere in the Metrorail system and one of only a handful such elevators in the United States. The WMATA is unsure why the design used such an elevator, rather than a traditional vertical elevator plus a horizontal walkway.

The north (lower) mezzanine is home to one of Metro's few fully public restrooms, an automatic self-cleaning toilet manufactured by Exeloo, opened in October 2003. The automatic restroom was installed as part of a pilot project to determine customer acceptance and feasibility of the concept, as well as the impact on safety and cleanliness. According to then-General Manager Richard A. White in the online Lunchtalk chat dated June 3, 2005, there are no plans to extend the program to any other stations.

Huntington is one of only two stations that is serviced exclusively by the Yellow Line, the other being .

Buses and parking
Bus routes from Huntington on Metrobus and Fairfax Connector serve much of southern Fairfax County.

A new 1,424-space parking garage located on the station's east side opened on August 14, 2008. There are 3,617 parking spaces at the station. The former surface parking lot off North Kings Highway is the center of an ongoing residential and business redevelopment project. Parking at Huntington Station costs $4.85 all day on weekdays, but is free on weekends and federal holidays.

References

External links 

 The Schumin Web Transit Center: Huntington Station

Washington Metro stations in Virginia
Stations on the Yellow Line (Washington Metro)
Railway stations in the United States opened in 1983
Transportation in Fairfax County, Virginia
1983 establishments in Virginia